In Germany, Signed German, known in German as Lautsprachbegleitende Gebärden or Lautbegleitende Gebärden (LBG, "Speech-accompanying signs"), is a manually coded form of German that uses the signs of German Sign Language.  It is used as a bridge to the German language in education and for simultaneous translation from German, not as a natural form of communication between deaf people.

External links
:de:Lautsprachbegleitende Gebärden

German
German language